AS Douanes is a Burkinabé football team based in Ouagadougou.

References

Douanes